Lt. Thomas Charles Jones (1 April 1901 – 19 July 1935) was a Welsh cricketer.  Jones was a left-handed batsman. He was born at Pontypool, Monmouthshire.

Jones made his first-class status debut for Glamorgan in 1925 against Somerset.  He played one further first-class match during that season against Gloucestershire.  His final first-class match for Glamorgan came against Warwickshire in 1928.  In his brief first-class career, he scored 36 runs at a batting average of 6.00 and a high score of 21.

Outside of cricket, Jones was a lieutenant in the British Army, which limited his appearances in first-class cricket.  Jones died at Westminster, London on 19 July 1935.

References

External links
Tom Jones at Cricinfo
Tom Jones at CricketArchive

1901 births
1935 deaths
Sportspeople from Pontypool
Welsh cricketers
Glamorgan cricketers
Graduates of the Royal Military College, Sandhurst
South Wales Borderers officers
20th-century British Army personnel